Thuvaraiyam Pathi is described in Ayyavazhi mythology. The Akilattirattu Ammanai, the holy text of Ayyavazhi, tells about a sunken land at about 152 miles either south or south-east to Kanyakumari, with 16008 streets. 

This land also matches the sunken land Kumarikkandam of ancient Tamil Nadu.

See also
Ayyavazhi mythology
List of Ayyavazhi-related articles

Ayyavazhi mythology
Mythological places